Triviidae is a taxonomic family of small sea snails, marine gastropod molluscs in the superfamily Cypraeoidea of the order Littorinimorpha.

Taxonomy
The following subfamilies were recognized in the taxonomy of Bouchet & Rocroi in 2005:
Eratoinae Gill, 1871
tribe Eratoini Gill, 1871
† tribe Johnstrupiini Schilder, 1939
† tribe Eratotriviini Schilder, 1936
Triviinae Troschel, 1863: represented as Triviidae Troschel, 1863

In the Taxonomy of the Gastropoda (Bouchet et al., 2017) Eratoinae is now recognized as the family Eratoidae and Triviinae is considered an alternate representation of Triviidae.

Genera
Genera within the family Triviidae include:
Subfamily Eratoinae has been raised to the status of family Eratoidae, Gill, 1871.
Subfamily Triviinae (alternate representation of Triviidae)
 Cleotrivia Iredale, 1930 
 Discotrivia C. N. Cate, 1979
 Dolichupis Iredale, 1930 
 Ellatrivia Schilder, 1939
 Gregoia Fehse, 2015 
 Niveria Jousseaume, 1884
 Novatrivia Fehse, 2015
 † Prototrivia Schilder, 1941 
 Pseudopusula Fehse & Grego, 2014
 Purpurcapsula Fehse & Grego, 2009
 Pusula Jousseaume, 1884
 Quasipusula Fehse & Grego, 2014
 Semitrivia Cossmann, 1903 
 Trivellona Iredale, 1931 
 Trivia Broderip, 1837
 Triviella Jousseaume, 1884 
 Trivirostra Jousseaume 1884 
Genera brought into synonymy
 Austrotrivia Fehse, 2002: synonym of Ellatrivia Cotton & Godfrey, 1932
 Circumscapula Cate, 1979: synonym of Niveria Jousseaume, 1884
 Decoriatrivia Cate, 1979: synonym of Dolichupis Iredale, 1930
 Discotrivia Cate, 1979: synonym of Pseudopusula Fehse & Grego, 2014
 Fossatrivia Schilder, 1939: synonym of Ellatrivia Cotton & Godfrey, 1932
 Galeatrivia Cate, 1979: synonym of Triviella Jousseaume, 1884
 Nototrivia Schilder, 1939 †: synonym of Trivellona Iredale, 1931
 Pseudotrivia Schilder, 1936: synonym of Trivellona Iredale, 1931
 Tribe Pusulini Schilder, 1936: synonym of Triviinae Troschel, 1863
 Robertotrivia Cate, 1979: synonym of Trivellona Iredale, 1931
 Sulcotrivia Schilder, 1933 †: synonym of Niveria Jousseaume, 1884
 Tribe Triviellini Schilder, 1939: synonym of Triviinae Troschel, 1863

References

Further reading 
 Powell A. W. B., New Zealand Mollusca, William Collins Publishers Ltd, Auckland, New Zealand 1979 
 Cate, C. N. 1979. A review of the Triviidae (Mollusca: Gastropoda). Memoirs of the San Diego Society of Natural History 10:1–126
 Glen Pownall, New Zealand Shells and Shellfish, Seven Seas Publishing Pty Ltd, Wellington, New Zealand 1979 
 Gosliner, T. M. and W. R. Liltved. 1982. Comparative morphology of three South African Triviidae (Gastropoda: Prosobranchia) with the description of a new species. Zoological Journal of the Linnean Society 74:111–132
 Gosliner, T. M. and W. R. Liltved. 1987. Further studies on the morphology of the Triviidae (Gastropoda: Prosobranchia) with emphasis on species from southern Africa. Zoological Journal of the Linnean Society 90:207–254
 Vaught, K.C. (1989). A classification of the living Mollusca. American Malacologists: Melbourne, FL (USA). . XII, 195 pp.
 Dolin, L. 2001. Les Triviidae (Mollusca: Caenogastropoda) de l'Indo-Pacifique: Révision des genres Trivia, Dolichupis et Trivellona. In: P. Bouchet and B.A. Marshall (eds), Tropical Deep-Sea Benthos, volume 22. Memoires du Museum national d'Histoire naturelle 185:201–241.
 Bouchet, P.; Rocroi, J.-P. (Ed.) (2005). Classification and nomenclator of gastropod families. Malacologia: International Journal of Malacology, 47(1-2). ConchBooks: Hackenheim, Germany. . 397 pp.

External links